Felipe de León (died 1728) was a Spanish painter of the Baroque period active in Seville. He imitated the style of Murillo in painting devotional pictures, and in producing copies of the master. He died at Seville.  He is presumed to be the brother of  the painter Cristóbal de León.

References

Year of birth missing
1728 deaths
18th-century Spanish painters
18th-century Spanish male artists
Spanish male painters
Spanish Baroque painters